Saeed Salem Saleh Salem Al Kathiri, also called Saeed Al Kathiri (born 28 March 1988 in Abu Dhabi, United Arab Emirates), is an Emirati footballer who plays as a defender. He also plays for Al Dhafra as a striker. He has played for the United Arab Emirates national football team since 2010.

Honours
United Arab Emirates
 Gulf Cup of Nations: 2013
 AFC Asian Cup third-place: 2015

References

External links 
 

1988 births
Living people
Emirati footballers
United Arab Emirates international footballers
Association football forwards
Al Wahda FC players
Al-Wasl F.C. players
Al Ain FC players
Al Dhafra FC players
2011 AFC Asian Cup players
2015 AFC Asian Cup players
UAE Pro League players
Asian Games medalists in football
Footballers at the 2010 Asian Games
Footballers at the 2014 Asian Games
Asian Games silver medalists for the United Arab Emirates
Medalists at the 2010 Asian Games